Studies in African Music is a 1959 book in two volumes by A.M. Jones. It is an in-depth analysis of the traditional music of the Ewe tribe.

Summary

The work is divided into two volumes, with the first volume being an analysis of the music presented in Volume II, and the second being full-score reproductions of the pieces in question.

Volume I Contents

 Introduction
 Play-Songs and Fishing Songs
 The Instruments of the Orchestra
 The Nyayito Dance
 Yeve Cult Music
 Club Dances - The Adzida Dance
 The Social Dance - Agbadza
 A Comparison of Drumming
 The Homogeneity of African Music
 Tone and Tune
 The Neo-Folk-Music

Volume II Contents

 Play-Songs and Fishing Songs
 The Nyayito Dance
 Yeve Cult Music: (a) The Husago Dance, (b) The Sovu Dance, (c) The Sogba Dance
 The Adzida Dance
 The Agbadza Dance
 The Icila Dance

Influence

Steve Reich has listed this work as an influence on his music, particularly his "fooling around with tape loops, which [he] began to envision as little mechanized Africans [laughs]." It is also cited extensively in Volume I of Gunther Schuller's (who introduced Reich to the work) History of Jazz.

References

External links
 Studies in African Music: Volume I at The Internet Archive
 Studies in African Music: Volume II at The Internet Archive

1959 non-fiction books
Music books
Ethnomusicology